Anna Lubiw is a computer scientist
known for her work in computational geometry and graph theory. She is currently a professor at the University of Waterloo.

Education 
Lubiw received her Ph.D from the University of Toronto in 1986 under the joint supervision of Rudolf Mathon and Stephen Cook.

Research
At Waterloo, Lubiw's students have included both Erik Demaine and his father Martin Demaine, with whom she published the first proof of the fold-and-cut theorem in mathematical origami. In graph drawing, Hutton and Lubiw found a polynomial time algorithm for upward planar drawing of graphs with a single source vertex. Other contributions of Lubiw include proving the NP-completeness of finding permutation patterns, and of finding derangements in permutation groups.

Awards 
Lubiw was named an ACM Distinguished Member in 2009.

Personal life
As well her academic work, Lubiw is an amateur violinist, and chairs the volunteer council in charge of the University of Waterloo orchestra. She is married to Jeffrey Shallit, also a computer scientist.

Selected publications
.
. First presented at the 2nd ACM-SIAM Symposium on Discrete Algorithms, 1991.
. First presented at WADS 1993.
.

References

External links
Home page at U. Waterloo

Year of birth missing (living people)
Living people
Canadian computer scientists
Canadian women computer scientists
Researchers in geometric algorithms
Graph drawing people
University of Toronto alumni
Academic staff of the University of Waterloo